Parliamentary elections were held in the Nagorno-Karabakh Republic on 18 June 2000. A total of 33 members of the National Assembly were elected. Voter turnout was 59.7%.

Campaign
A total of 115 candidates contested the elections, of which 88 were independents and 25 were members of political parties.

Results

References

Nagorno-Karabakh
Nagorno-Karabakh
2000 in the Nagorno-Karabakh Republic
Elections in the Republic of Artsakh
Election and referendum articles with incomplete results